Municipal elections took place in Brazil on 15 November 2020 (and 29 November, for cities with more than 200,000 voters where the second polling date was available). Electors chose Mayors, Vice-Mayors and City Councillors of all 5,568 cities of the country. The partisan conventions took place between 31 August and 16 September. They were the first elections since Bolsonaro's election as President.

Electoral calendar
The Superior Electoral Court defined on 17 December 2019 the Electoral Calendar for 2020 Brazilian municipal election. According to the calendar, the first round should take place on 4 October, and the second round, on 25 October, from 8 am to 5 pm in both cases. Due to the COVID-19 pandemic, however, these dates were moved forward to 15 November and 29 November, respectively.

Background
The 2020 municipal elections are the first since the general elections of 2018, marking the rise of bolsonarism, a movement in support of President Jair Bolsonaro, and a new political-electoral dynamic emerging on the political scene; in a way, an assessment of the President's electoral strength.

The 2018 general elections, in addition to choosing the President of the Republic, the Governors of State and the Federal District, Senators and Federal, State and District Deputies, granted new mayors to many cities in the country. This happened due to article 14, §6, of the Constitution, establishing that:To run for other positions, the President of the Republic, the State and Federal District Governors and the Mayors must resign their respective mandates up to six months before the election.

— Article 14, §6, of the Constitution of the Federative Republic of BrasilThus, many mayors, wishing to run for other positions, had to resign their mandate until 5 April 2018, starting a new management in such municipalities. Those who took on such management would be responsible for the remaining period, that is, until 31 December 2020.

The following mayors resigned from their post to be a candidate for governor in 2018:

 Carlos Amastha (PSB), Mayor of Palmas;
 Carlos Eduardo Alves (PDT), Mayor of Natal;
 Marcus Alexandre (PT), Mayor of Rio Branco;
 João Doria (PSDB), Mayor of São Paulo;
 José Ronaldo (DEM), Mayor of Feira de Santana.

Of the mayors mentioned above, only one was successful, João Dória, the others, in addition to not winning the elections they disputed, lost their positions as Mayor.

In March 2020, a discussion involving the postponement of the election surrounded the Congress, due to the coronavirus pandemic in Brazil. Some mayors and federal deputies propose that the election should be rescheduled to 2021 or 2022, fusing with the 2022 general election. Both President of the Superior Electoral Court, Justice Rosa Weber, and President of the Chamber of Deputies, deputy Rodrigo Maia (DEM-RJ), state that it is "a premature debate" and that it could cause "a very large institutional risk", respectively. Federal deputy Aécio Neves (PSDB-MG) filed in a bill to postpone the election to October 2022 and unify all the elections, reduce the term length for senators to four years, ban re-election for executive seats (president, governors and mayors) and increase their term length to five years.

The year 2020 marks the entry of Generation Z into the electoral race, with the youngest group being between 18 and 20 years old, the increase in the number of applications from religious priests and the multiplication of candidates who present themselves armed and in favor of armamentism.

Election system

Mayoral election 
The mayoral election has a difference depending on the population of the municipality in question. In municipalities with up to 200,000 voters the first-past-the-post system is used, while in municipalities more than 200,000 the two-round system is used, in compliance with article 77 of the Constitution.The Municipality will be governed by an organic law, voted in two rounds, with a minimum intersection of ten days, and approved by two-thirds of the members of the City Council, who will promulgate it, in compliance with the principles established in this Constitution, in the Constitution of the respective State and the following precepts:

I – election of the Mayor, the Vice-Mayor and the Councilors, for a term of four years, by means of a direct and simultaneous election held throughout the country;

II – election of the Mayor and the Vice-Mayor held on the first Sunday of October of the year preceding the end of the mandate of those who must succeed, applying the rules of art. 77, in the case of Municipalities with more than two hundred thousand voters;

III – inauguration of the Mayor and the Vice-Mayor on 1 January of the year following the election;

IV – for the composition of the City Councils, the maximum limit of:

[Limited number of members of the City Councils in the country according to the number of inhabitants, ranging from 9 councilors (for cities with uo 15,000 people) to 55 councilors (for cities with more than 8,000,000, only one Municipality: São Paulo)]

[...]

— Article 29 of the Constitution of the Federative Republic of Brazil
The election of the President and Vice-President of the Republic will take place, simultaneously, on the first Sunday of October, in the first round, and on the last Sunday of October, in the second round, if any, of the previous year. the end of the current presidential term.

§1. The election of the President of the Republic will import that of the Vice-President registered with him.

§2. The candidate who, registered by a political party, obtains an absolute majority of votes will be considered elected, not counting the blank and null votes.

§3. If no candidate reaches an absolute majority in the first vote, a new election will be held within twenty days after the result is proclaimed, with the two most voted candidates running and the one with the most valid votes being considered elected.

§4. If, before the second round takes place, death, withdrawal or legal impediment of a candidate occurs, the one with the most votes will be called, among the remainder.

§5. If, in the hypothesis of the previous paragraphs, more than one candidate with the same vote remains in second place, the oldest will be qualified.

— Article 77 of the Constitution of the Federative Republic of Brazil.

City Council election 
The election for City Councils uses the system of proportional representation by open list, however, unlike previous elections, there will be no formation of coalitions for Municipal Legislative Powers, so each party will form a separate list.

Results

Results in capitals

Note: Macapá postponed the first round to 6 December and the second round to 20 December because of a major blackout in Amapá. This did not happen in other municipalities in the state.

National level 
In the 2016 municipal elections, parties had the following votes at national level:

References

Municipal
Elections postponed due to the COVID-19 pandemic
November 2020 events in Brazil